Fatah Mohammed  (born 9 October 1950) is a former Iraqi football midfielder who played for Iraq in the 1976 AFC Asian Cup.

Fatah played for the national team in 1976.

References

Iraqi footballers
Iraq international footballers
1976 AFC Asian Cup players
Living people
Association football midfielders
1950 births